Katharine “Kit” Bigelow is an American religious freedom and human rights advocate. She is based in Washington, D.C.

As director of external affairs for the National Spiritual Assembly of the Baháʼís of the U.S. for twenty-five years, Bigelow had overall responsibility for the functioning of the Washington-based Office of External Affairs and of the Office of the U.S. Baháʼí Representative to the United Nations in New York. She retired from the position in June 2010.

She had overall responsibility for the Baháʼí Refugee Office and the Office of Public Information until their integration into other agencies of the U.S. National Spiritual Assembly. Issues included human rights, religious freedom, the advancement of women, refugee affairs, sustainable development, media relations, and UN matters.

She represented the National Spiritual Assembly in the promotion and protection of human rights, including religious freedom, the advancement of the rights of women, U.S. ratification of UN human rights treaties, and the elimination of racism. She advocated on these issues, often with other nongovernmental organizations, at the White House, the State Department, the U.S. Congress, and the United Nations.

She was responsible for informing the U.S. government and U.S. national news media about the persecution of the Baháʼí communities in Iran and other Muslim countries. She testified in numerous hearings and briefings before Congress on the oppression of the Baháʼís in Iran and in Egypt.

For eight years, she was the co-chair of the national Working Group for U.S. Ratification of the UN Convention on the Elimination of All Forms of Discrimination Against Women (CEDAW). She was actively involved in U.S.
ratification of the UN Genocide Convention, the Convention Against Torture, the Convention on Civil and Political Rights, and the Convention Against Racial Discrimination.

She was the representative for the Baháʼís of the U.S. at the 1993 UN World Conference on Human Rights in Vienna and the 1995 Fourth World Conference on Women in Beijing. In March 2000, she served as a public sector adviser on the U.S. government delegation to the UN Commission on the Status of Women.

Bigelow was co-founder and co-chair of the Washington-based Working Group on the Human Rights of Women. She was a founder and treasurer of the board of directors of U.S. Women Connect, which implements the Platform for Action and the U.S. Women's National Action Agenda. She also served on the board of directors of WATEO, the Women and Environment Organization, operating in Iraq.

She is on the executive steering committee of the Women in International Law Interest Group of the American Society of International Law and has served as its co-chair. She is also a member of the Women's Foreign Policy Group, and the Women in International Security.

Bigelow received the 2011 National Award from the International Religious Liberty Association. She has spoken and published on human rights, religious freedom, international law, and the UN system, including at Harvard University and Law School, the University of Notre Dame, American University and Miami University. Her article, “A Campaign to Deter Genocide: The Baháʼí Experience,” was published in Genocide Watch by Yale University Press.

Bigelow received her degree at Smith College where she was elected to Phi Beta Kappa. She holds an MBA in international business from Georgetown University. Before her work for the National Spiritual Assembly, she held professional positions in both the public and private sectors in financial management and economic development.

Notes

Living people
Smith College alumni
McDonough School of Business alumni
American Bahá'ís
Year of birth missing (living people)